Charles Gunther may refer to:

Charles F. Gunther (1837–1920), German-American candymaker and collector of historical artifacts
Charles Godfrey Gunther (1822–1885), mayor of New York, 1864–1866
Charles Günther, Count of Schwarzburg-Rudolstadt (1576–1630), German nobleman